Akseh, also rendered as Achseh, may refer to:
 Akseh-ye Olya
 Akseh-ye Sofla